The Good Food Guide has been reviewing the best restaurants, pubs and cafés in Great Britain since 1951.

In October 2021, Adam Hyman purchased The Good Food Guide for an undisclosed sum from Waitrose & Partners. The Guide is being relaunched in spring 2022 as part of The Good Food Club. The Guide will no longer be published annually in print but will instead be published in an app that will be continuously updated with new Guide entries along with a The Good Food Guide Weekly digital newsletter, location guides and Club perks and offers.

All reviews are based on the huge volume of feedback that we receive from readers and this, together with anonymous expert inspections, ensures that every entry is assessed afresh. Every inspected meal is paid for. For consistency we allow a new restaurant to settle in for a period of six months before we send an inspector to review with the view for potential inclusion in the Guide. Readers of the Guide are still actively encouraged to submit their reviews, via the Good Food Guide website, which are then considered for prospective inclusion in the Guide.

Elizabeth Carter was appointed as editor of The Good Food Guide in November 2007. She has been an active restaurant inspector and contributor to the Guide since the 1990s, and has extensive experience in restaurant-related publishing and media. Previous roles have included editor of Les Routiers UK and Ireland Guide (2002-2004) and editor of the AA Restaurant Guide (1997-2000).

History
The Good Food Guide was first compiled by Raymond Postgate in 1951. Appalled by the British post-war dining experience, Postgate formed The Good Food Club, recruiting an army of volunteers to inspect restaurants anonymously and report back. His aims were simple; among them, ‘to raise the standard of cooking in Britain’ and ‘to do ourselves all a bit of good by making our holidays, travels and evenings-out in due course more enjoyable’. Following the success of The Good Food Club, reports were compiled and The Good Food Guide was published.

Although much has changed since the very first edition of The Good Food Guide, the ethos of the original book remains. The Good Food Guide is about empowering diners, helping readers to find the very best places to eat and encouraging restaurants to offer the best possible food, service and experience. One change for the better is the now universal condemnation of bootcamp conditions in restaurant kitchens, where bullying and aggression towards staff were commonplace. We take a very strong view on kitchen abuse. In order to encourage supportive and sustainable working environments within the industry, we will temporarily remove any restaurant that is shown to neglect the welfare and mental health of its staff, until we are satisfied that the necessary steps have been taken to change. To promote careers in hospitality, it is important that head chefs, executive chefs and restaurateurs are seen to be working towards good workplace conditions.

In August 2013, the guide was purchased and published by Waitrose & Partners. The guide continued to be published annually, until May 2021.

Awards
Every year the Guide presents its Editor's Awards in a selection of the following categories; Restaurant of the Year, Best New Entry, Chef of the Year, Chef to Watch, Best for Sustainability and Best Local Restaurant.

Publications
 The Good Food Guide Dinner Party Book (Hilary Fawcett and Jeanne Strang, 1971)
 The Good Food Guide Second Dinner Party Book (Hilary Fawcett, Hodder & Stoughton Ltd, 1979)
 Good Cook's Guide: More Recipes from Restaurants in the "Good Food Guide" (1974)
 The Good Food Guide: Recipes - Celebrating 60 of the UK's Best Chefs and Restaurants (Which? Books, 2010) 
 The Good Food Guide 2016 (Waitrose, 2015)

References

External links

British cuisine
Hospitality industry in the United Kingdom
Restaurant guides
Waitrose